Douglas Township is a township in Clay County, Iowa, USA.  As of the 2010 United States census, its population was 168.

History
Douglas Township was created in 1860.

In the 2000 United States census, Douglas had a total population of 212, bearing 162 adults 7 non-white residents.

Geography
According to the USGS, it contains three cemeteries: Douglas Township, Fanny Fern and Zion.

Notes

References
 USGS Geographic Names Information System (GNIS)

External links
 US-Counties.com
 City-Data.com

Townships in Clay County, Iowa
Townships in Iowa